The Roman Catholic Church in the Cameroon comprises 5 ecclesiastical provinces and 21 suffragan dioceses.

List of dioceses

Ecclesiastical Conference of Cameroon

Ecclesiastical Province of Bamenda 
Archdiocese of Bamenda
Diocese of Buéa
Diocese of Kumba
Diocese of Kumbo
Diocese of Mamfe

Ecclesiastical Province of Bertoua 
Archdiocese of Bertoua
Diocese of Batouri
Diocese of Doumé–Abong’ Mbang
Diocese of Yokadouma

Ecclesiastical Province of Douala 
Archdiocese of Douala
Diocese of Bafang
Diocese of Bafoussam
Diocese of Edéa
Diocese of Eséka
Diocese of Nkongsamba

Ecclesiastical Province of Garoua 
Archdiocese of Garoua
Diocese of Maroua-Mokolo
Diocese of Ngaoundéré
Diocese of Yagoua

Ecclesiastical Province of Yaoundé 
Archdiocese of Yaoundé
Diocese of Bafia
Diocese of Ebolowa
Diocese of Kribi
Diocese of Mbalmayo
Diocese of Obala
Diocese of Sangmélima

External links 
Catholic-Hierarchy entry.
GCatholic.org.

Cameroon
Catholic dioceses